Shun'ya or Shunya (written: 俊也, 駿也, 隼也, 峻野, 駿冶 or 駿哉) is a masculine Japanese given name. Notable people with the name include:

, Japanese footballer
, Japanese film director
, Japanese footballer
, Japanese actor
, Japanese footballer
, Japanese hurdler
, Japanese footballer

See also
Śūnyatā

Japanese masculine given names